Enteromius carens is a species of ray-finned fish in the genus Enteromius which is found in the lower Congo Basin in the Congo, Democratic Republic of Congo and Cabinda Province of Angola.

Footnotes 

 

Enteromius
Taxa named by George Albert Boulenger
Fish described in 1912